Zoran Martič is a Slovenian basketball coach.

Best results
 1998 – 2nd  place European U22 championship
 2000 – 1st place European U20 championship
 2001 – 6th place World U20 championship
 2003/04 – 5th place Goodyear – Adriatic league (Budučnost)
 2004/05 – semi finalist of the Serbia & Montenegro cup (Budučnost)
 2005 – finalist of the Slovenian play off (Slovan)
 2006 – quarter finalist of FIBA Challenge cup
 2007 – semi finalist of the Slovenian play off (Zlatorog Laško)
 2008 – finalist of the Slovenian Cup and finalist of the Slovenian play off (Helios), winner of the Slovenian all star game
 2014 – Macedonian League winner, Macedonian Cup winner (MZT Skopje)
 2018 – Slovenian League champion (2018)

Personal life
Martič's older brother, Zvezdan Martič, is a journalist and engineer.

References

External links 
 STA sports group 
 BG basket

1965 births
Living people
KK Budućnost coaches
KK Krka coaches
Slovenian basketball coaches
Sportspeople from Celje
KK Olimpija coaches
KK Helios Domžale coaches